Caldarchaeol is a membrane-spanning lipid found in hyperthermophilic archaea.  Membranes made up of caldarchaeol are more stable since the hydrophobic chains are linked together, allowing the microorganisms to withstand high temperatures.  It is also known as dibiphytanyldiglycerol tetraether. Two glycerol units are linked together by two strains which consist of two phytanes linked together to form a linear chain of 32 carbon atoms (40 carbons including methyl sidechains).

The configuration of the macrocyclic tetraether has been determined by total synthesis of the C40-diol and comparison with a sample of obtained by degradation of natural tetraether.  A synthesis of tetraether has also been carried out.

Notes

Additional references 
 Focus of research, University of Occupational and Environmental Health, Kitakyushu, Japan
 Langworthy TA, Biochim Biophys Acta 1977, 487, 37
 Monolayer properties of archaeol and caldarchaeol polar lipids of a methanogenic archaebacterium, Methanospirillum hungatei, at the air/water interface. Tomoaia-Cotisel M, Chifu E, Zsako J, Mocanu A, Quinn PJ, Kates M. Chem Phys Lipids. 1992 Nov;63(1-2):131-8
 Ether polar lipids of methanogenic bacteria: structures, comparative aspects, and biosyntheses.  Koga Y, Nishihara M, Morii H, Akagawa-Matsushita M. Microbiol Rev. 1993 Mar;57(1):164-82.

Lipids
Macrocycles